"Drift Away" is a song by Mentor Williams written in 1970 and originally recorded by John Henry Kurtz on his 1972 album Reunion. Mentor Williams was a country songwriter, and John Henry Kurtz was an actor and swamp rock singer. It was later given to soul singer Dobie Gray for whom it became a surprise international hit and the best known version. In 1973 the song became Dobie Gray's biggest hit, peaking at #5 on the Billboard Hot 100 and certified gold by the RIAA. It was the final pop hit for Decca Records in the United States.

A new version by Uncle Kracker, with Gray, became a major hit in 2003.

Chart performance (Dobie Gray)

Weekly charts

Year-end charts

Other versions

Narvel Felts version

A country version was recorded by Narvel Felts in 1973. Felts' version — which changed the lyrics "I wanna get lost in your rock and roll" to "I wanna get lost in your country song" — peaked at #8 on the Billboard''' Hot Country Singles chart in mid-August 1973, about three months after Gray's version reached its popularity peak. This song marked Narvel's first success in the country scene, as he was known from the late 1950s as a rockabilly singer.

Chart performance (Narvel Felts)

Michael Bolton version

Michael Bolton covered "Drift Away" and released it as the second single from his 1992 covers album, Timeless: The Classics, in December 1992.  His rendition became the only hit version of the song in the United Kingdom, where it reached number 18, and also charted in Ireland and New Zealand.

Charts

Uncle Kracker featuring Dobie Gray version

American singer-songwriter Uncle Kracker released a cover version from his second studio album, No Stranger to Shame (2002), in January 2003. This version, which featured Dobie Gray singing the bridge and singing backing vocals and final verse with Kracker, reached number nine on the Hot 100. The song was in the year-end top 20 just like the original 1973 version. It spent a then-record-setting 28 weeks atop the adult contemporary chart in the US. It also peaked at number 25 on the New Zealand Singles Chart.

Music video
The music video was directed by Bronston Jones. Filmed in Kracker's hometown of Detroit, it shows him performing the song on stage to an audience (Dobie, during his parts, comes in to perform) and Kracker working at a garage (owned by his brother), unloading and stacking tires. Scenes also feature him walking alone on snowy railroad tracks, and singing on an empty stage in the garage. His mechanic's uniform is labeled "Matt," a reference to his real first name, Matthew.

Charts

Weekly charts

Year-end charts

Release history

Other cover versions
"Drift Away" has also been covered by many bands and vocalists around the world. Versions include those of Clarence Carter, Uncle Kracker, Allan Clarke, Roy Orbison, Ike & Tina Turner, Humble Pie, Mud, Jackie DeShannon, Rod Stewart, James Hollis, Waylon Jennings, Ray Charles, the Neville Brothers, Jon Bon Jovi, Copperhead, Christian Kane, the Rolling Stones, the Nylons, Ringo Starr (sharing the lead vocal duties with Tom Petty and Alanis Morissette, with Steven Tyler on the drums), Bruce Springsteen, BoDeans, Judson Spence, Billy Joe Royal, Steve Young and John Kay.
Folk singer Tom Rush recorded the song on his album What I Know, released in 2009.

The Rolling Stones recorded a cover of the song during the sessions for their It's Only Rock 'n Roll LP in 1974, but it did not appear on the finished album. It was finally given an official release in October 2021 as part of the Tattoo You reissue. The Heptones recorded a reggae version which is included on many compilation CDs. Street Corner Symphony also sang a version of this song as their swan song on the season 2 finale of the NBC series The Sing-Off; that version is arranged by Deke Sharon. Bon Jovi usually played the song live in 1987: a version was recorded as part of a Westwood One radio live series concert. Dolly Parton and Anne Murray performed the song together in 1976 on Parton's variety show Dolly!, though they sang the lyrics of the Felts' version ("I want to get lost in your country song").

Garth Brooks for the 2013 Blue-Eyed Soul album in the Blame It All on My Roots: Five Decades of Influences compilation.

Temuera Morrison recorded and included Drift Away in his 2014 debut album Tem.

Country music star Lynn Anderson (who was the partner of Mentor Williams, who wrote the song) recorded a gospel version that was rewritten by Williams for her 2015 gospel album, Drift Away'', which would become her final album.

See also
List of Billboard Adult Contemporary number ones of 2003 and 2004 (U.S.)

References

1972 songs
1972 singles
1973 singles
2003 singles
Uncle Kracker songs
Narvel Felts songs
Dobie Gray songs
American soft rock songs
American soul songs
Songs written by Mentor Williams
Songs about music
Swamp rock songs
Columbia Records singles
Decca Records singles
Lava Records singles
ABC Records singles